Marko Divković (born 11 June 1999) is a Croatian professional footballer who plays as a forward for Brøndby in the Danish Superliga.

Career

Youth years
Divković started his career at his local football club Polet Donje Novo Selo in Donje Novo Selo, before moving on to the bigger . He was subsequently scouted by Arsenal scouts and moved to Arsenal's Greek academy based in Loutraki. At the beginning on 2017, Divković joined DAC Dunajská Streda.

DAC Dunajská Streda
Divković made his Fortuna Liga debut for DAC against Železiarne Podbrezová on 22 July 2017. He was fielded in the second half as a replacement for Slovak international Erik Pačinda, who scored the match's sole goal - DAC had beaten Podbrezová 1:0.

Brøndby
On 31 August 2021, Divković joined Danish Superliga club Brøndby IF on a season-long loan deal with an option to buy. He made his debut on 16 September in a 0–0 draw against Sparta Prague in the UEFA Europa League group stage. He came on as a substitute for Mikael Uhre in the 69th minute. His debut in the domestic league followed three days later, coming on as a second-half substitute for Simon Hedlund in a 1–0 loss away to SønderjyskE.

On 3 March 2022, Brøndby IF announced that they had triggered the option to buy, and Divković signed a four-year contract with the club, starting in July 2022.

International career
In August 2019, Divković received a pre-invitation to the Croatia U21 team, but did not feature in any matches.

Career statistics

References

External links
 FC DAC 1904 Dunajská Streda official club profile
 Eurofotbal profile
  
 Futbalnet Profile
 

1999 births
Living people
Sportspeople from Vinkovci
Croatian footballers
Croatian expatriate footballers
Croatia under-21 international footballers
Association football forwards
FC DAC 1904 Dunajská Streda players
Brøndby IF players
Slovak Super Liga players
Danish Superliga players
Expatriate footballers in Slovakia
Expatriate men's footballers in Denmark
Croatian expatriate sportspeople in Slovakia
Croatian expatriate sportspeople in Denmark